Spain participated in the Eurovision Song Contest 2006 with the song "Un Blodymary" written by Manuel Ruiz Gómez "Queco". The song was performed by the group Las Ketchup, which was selected by Spanish broadcaster Televisión Española (TVE) to represent the nation at the 2006 contest in Athens, Greece. Las Ketchup and "Un Blodymary" were presented to the public as the Spanish entry on 27 February 2006 during the evening magazine programme España Directo.

As a member of the "Big Four", Spain automatically qualified to compete in the final of the Eurovision Song Contest. Performing in position 6, Spain placed twenty-first out of the 24 participating countries with 18 points.

Background 

Prior to the 2006 contest, Spain had participated in the Eurovision Song Contest forty-five times since its first entry in 1961. The nation has won the contest on two occasions: in 1968 with the song "La, la, la" performed by Massiel and in 1969 with the song "Vivo cantando" performed by Salomé, the latter having won in a four-way tie with France, the Netherlands and the United Kingdom. Spain has also finished second four times, with Karina in 1971, Mocedades in 1973, Betty Missiego in 1979 and Anabel Conde in 1995. In 2005, Spain placed twenty-first with the song "Brujería" performed by Son de Sol.

The Spanish national broadcaster, Televisión Española (TVE), broadcasts the event within Spain and organises the selection process for the nation's entry. TVE confirmed their intentions to participate at the 2006 Eurovision Song Contest on 16 December 2005. From 2000 to 2005, TVE had set up national finals with several artists to choose both the song and performer to compete at Eurovision for Spain, including the reality television music competition Operación Triunfo. For their 2006 entry, the broadcaster opted to select both the artist and song via an internal selection.

Before Eurovision

Internal selection 
A submission period was open from 16 December 2005 until 31 January 2006. Only artists signed to record labels were eligible to submit entries and songs were required to be performed in one of the official languages of Spain. At the conclusion of the submission period, 245 entries were received. A committee evaluated the entries received and announced on 25 February 2006 during the La 1 evening magazine programme España Directo that four acts had been shortlisted to represent Spain at the 2006 contest: Chenoa, Las Ketchup, and former Spanish Eurovision contestants Azúcar Moreno and David Civera which represented Spain in 1990 and 2001, respectively. On 27 February 2006, TVE announced during España Directo that they had internally selected the group Las Ketchup to represent Spain in Athens. During the programme, it was also revealed that Las Ketchup would sing the song "Un Blodymary", written by Manuel Ruiz Gómez "Queco".

At Eurovision
According to Eurovision rules, all nations with the exceptions of the host country, the "Big Four" (France, Germany, Spain and the United Kingdom) and the ten highest placed finishers in the 2005 contest are required to qualify from the semi-final in order to compete for the final; the top ten countries from the semi-final progress to the final. As a member of the "Big 4", Spain automatically qualified to compete in the final on 20 May 2006. In addition to their participation in the final, Spain is also required to broadcast and vote in the semi-final on 18 May 2006. During the running order draw for the semi-final and final on 21 March 2006, Spain was placed to perform in position 6 in the final, following the entry from Norway and before the entry from Malta. Spain placed twenty-first in the final, scoring 18 points.

In Spain, both the semi-final and the final were broadcast on La 1 with commentary by Beatriz Pécker. The Spanish spokesperson, who announced the Spanish votes during the final, was Sonia Ferrer. The broadcast of the final was watched by 4.892 million viewers in Spain with a market share of 38.9%. This represented an increase of 3.4% from the previous year with 720,000 more viewers.

Voting 
Below is a breakdown of points awarded to Spain and awarded by Spain in the semi-final and grand final of the contest. The nation awarded its 12 points to Armenia in the semi-final and to Romania in the final of the contest.

Points awarded to Spain

Points awarded by Spain

References

2006
Countries in the Eurovision Song Contest 2006
Eurovision
Eurovision